Charles McGill (3 February 1903 – 1988) was a Scottish footballer who played as a left back. He spent much of his career in the United States, most of it with Fall River Marksmen, where he won the American Soccer League three times (1925–26, 1928–29 and 1930). He returned to Scotland in 1931 where he spent seven years with Aberdeen, being part of the team that finished in third place in 1935–36 Scottish Division One table and runners-up in 1936–37, although he was not selected for the 1937 Scottish Cup Final.

McGill was selected once for the Scottish Football League XI against the English Football League XI in 1935.

References

1903 births
1988 deaths
Footballers from Kilmarnock
Scottish footballers
Association football defenders
Scottish Junior Football Association players
Highland Football League players
Heart of Midlothian F.C. players
Queen of the South F.C. players
Darvel F.C. players
Aberdeen F.C. players
Forres Mechanics F.C. players
Third Lanark A.C. players
Boston Soccer Club players
New York Yankees (soccer) players
Boston Bears players
Fall River Marksmen players
Scottish Football League players
Scottish Football League representative players
American Soccer League (1921–1933) players
Scottish expatriate sportspeople in the United States
Expatriate soccer players in the United States
Scottish expatriate footballers
Scottish emigrants to the United States